0711 / Cycling was a national team founded in 2013 and based in Germany. It participated in UCI Continental Circuits races. In January 2016 it was announced that the team had agreed a one-year sponsorship deal with Christina Jewelry & Watches, who had previously owned the  squad. In 2017 the team changed names to reflect the area code where the team's headquarters are. 2017 was the final year at UCI Continental level for the team. the team raced one year at Amateur level before disbanding.

Final team roster
Source:

Major wins
Sources:
2014
 Stage 6 Tour of China I, Tino Thömel
2016
  National Time Trial championships, Till Drobisch
  Overall Tour du Maroc, Stefan Schumacher
2017
  National Time Trial championships, Till Drobisch
2018
  Overall Trofej Kuči, Andrej Petrovski
Stages 1 & 2, Andrej Petrovski
  National Road race Championships, Andrej Petrovski
  National Time trial Championships, Andrej Petrovski

National champions
2016
  Time Trial, Till Drobisch
2017
  Time Trial, Till Drobisch
2018
  Road race, Andrej Petrovski
  Time trial, Andrej Petrovski

References

Cycling teams based in Germany
Cycling teams established in 2013